Swen is a given name and a surname. Notable people with the name include

Given name
Swen Gillberg, visual effects supervisor
Swen König (born 1985), Swiss footballer
Swen Nater (born 1950), Dutch basketball player
Swen Schuller (born 1971), German sport shooter
Swen Swenson (1930–1993), American dancer and singer
Swen Vincke, Belgian video game designer, founder of Larian Studios

Surname
Saylee Swen (born 1984), Liberian footballer

See also
Sven
Sweyn

Given names